The Peace of Boulogne may refer to:

 The 1550 treaty between France, England, and Scotland, to end the War of the Rough Wooing
 The 1573 Edict of Boulogne